The Improved Load Bearing Equipment (ILBE) is a United States Marine Corps program that had included individual load carriage equipment, individual hydration systems (Source One Hydration) and individual water purification.

Since the rucksack was the first component of the program to be issued to Marines, the rucksack is commonly referred to as simply the ILBE. The ILBE rucksack was designed to replace the long existing All-purpose Lightweight Individual Carrying Equipment (ALICE) and newer Modular Lightweight Load-carrying Equipment (MOLLE) packs.

Design
The ILBE was designed during the Law Enforcement and Armed Forces (LEAF) program by Arc'teryx, and later manufactured by Propper.

The backpack is made from 725 Denier Cordura material (725 D), with the MARPAT camouflage pattern printed onto it. The pack is also covered with a wide grid of the Pouch Attachment Ladder System (PALS), for the attachment of smaller modular pouches. It includes a main pack, a detachable assault pack and a 100-ounce (3 litre) water reservoir as part of the hydration system.

Specialized bags and pouches for corpsmen and reconnaissance units are also available.

The ILBE system includes 6 types of packs:
Main Pack (75L)
Recon Main Pack (90L)
Assault Pack (27L)
Corpsman Assault Pack (39L)
Recon Assault Pack (39L)
Recon Accessory Pouch (5L)
Hydration System (3L)

These packs are paired with waterproofing bags in 56L, 65L, and 9L capacities.

The assault packs, with their smaller volume and lower weight capacities, are intended for wear in combat, while the larger main packs are intended to carry everything needed by a unit on the march. A set of packs typically consists of a main pack, an assault pack, and a hydration system. These three items together cost more than $600 when the ILBE system was first fielded, making it the most expensive single soldier pack system used by the US armed forces.

Criticism
Because the ILBE was fielded before the creation of the Modular Tactical Vest (MTV), the pack did not integrate well with the fighting system at the time (such as the Interceptor Body Armor), and excessive stress in conjunction with the wearing of body armor could cause discomfort and injury.

Future
The Marine Corps Systems Command (MARCORSYSCOM) announced that a replacement was forthcoming in 2009, with possible replacements, including two entries from Mystery Ranch, Granite Gear, and the United States Army improved variant of MOLLE.

In the year 2011, the Corps had finished testing and evaluation, releasing a solicitation for prototypes under the designation Family of Improved Load Bearing Equipment (FILBE), outlining design requirements that are similar to the improved MOLLE system.

See also

Family of Improved Load Bearing Equipment
MOLLE
All-purpose Lightweight Individual Carrying Equipment
Modular Tactical Vest
Interceptor Body Armor
Marine Corps Combat Utility Uniform

References

External links
 Olive-drab.com: "ILBE Improved Load Bearing Equipment" article describing ILBE

Personal military carrying equipment
United States Marine Corps equipment
Military equipment introduced in the 2000s